Agnotocastor is an extinct member of the beaver family Castoridae. Unlike its modern relative, this species took the place of muskrats in the rivers of North America during the Oligocene epoch. The earliest species is A. galushai, which is also the first reliable member of the Castoridae.

References

Prehistoric beavers
Eocene rodents
Oligocene rodents
Prehistoric rodent genera
Eocene mammals of Asia
Oligocene mammals of Asia
Eocene mammals of North America
Oligocene mammals of North America